Sori Choi is a Korean traditional percussionist known for performing traditional Korean musical styles and contemporary art music by modern composers.

Choi was born in Seoul, South Korea. She began studying janggu at age 6. Choi studied traditional Korean percussion instruments at the National High School of Korean Music and at the Music College of Seoul National University. She is a student of two Important Intangible Cultural Properties of Korea master percussionists, studying janggu with Kim Yeong-taek and soribuk (barrel drum buk used in pansori) with Park Geun-young.

In 2010, Choi began touring internationally with the Korean Music Project (KMP), sponsored by South Korea's Ministry of Culture, Sports and Tourism. She has given world premieres by many Korean and European contemporary composers, and has given presentations, performances, and workshops on traditional Korean percussion instruments at many international music festivals, including the 2012 and 2014 Darmstädter Ferienkurse (Darmstadt International Summer Courses for New Music).

References

External links
Sori Choi official website

Korean traditional musicians
Musicians from Seoul
South Korean percussionists
Seoul National University alumni
Living people
Date of birth missing (living people)
Year of birth missing (living people)